Byram Center is an unincorporated community and census-designated place (CDP) located in Byram Township, in Sussex County, New Jersey, United States. As of the 2010 United States Census, the CDP's population was 90.

Geography
According to the United States Census Bureau, Byram Center had a total area of 1.117 square miles (2.894 km2), all of which was land.

Demographics

Census 2010

References

Byram Township, New Jersey
Census-designated places in Sussex County, New Jersey